Westree is an unincorporated community in the Unorganized, North Part of Sudbury District in northeastern Ontario, Canada. The community is on the Canadian National Railway mainline, and is the location of Westree railway station served by Via Rail.

References 

Communities in Sudbury District